Calvin Ronald Verdonk (born 26 April 1997) is a Dutch professional footballer who plays as a left back for Eredivisie club NEC.

He is of Indonesian descent.

Career
Verdonk is a youth exponent from Feyenoord. He signed his first professional contract with the club on 24 April 2014 agreeing a three-year deal. He made his Eredivisie debut at 8 March 2015 against Excelsior Rotterdam replacing Lucas Woudenberg after 73 minutes in a 3–0 home win. On 11 November 2015, he extended the contract to mid-2020.

On 24 May 2016, he was loaned for a season to PEC Zwolle. On 2 August 2017, he was loaned for a season again, this time to NEC Nijmegen.

On 11 September 2020, he joined Famalicão in Portugal on a four-year contract. On 30 August 2021, he returned to NEC on a season-long loan. On 6 July 2022, NEC made the transfer permanent by purchasing his rights.

Honours
Feyenoord
Johan Cruijff Shield: 2018

References

External links
 

1997 births
Dutch people of Indonesian descent
Footballers from Dordrecht
Living people
Dutch footballers
Association football midfielders
Netherlands under-21 international footballers
Netherlands youth international footballers
Feyenoord players
PEC Zwolle players
NEC Nijmegen players
FC Twente players
F.C. Famalicão players
Eredivisie players
Eerste Divisie players
Primeira Liga players
Dutch expatriate footballers
Expatriate footballers in Portugal
Dutch expatriate sportspeople in Portugal